The Bad News Bears in Breaking Training is a 1977 American sports comedy-drama film and a sequel to the 1976 feature film The Bad News Bears.

Plot
This film picks up the Bears' career one year after their infamous second-place finish in the North Valley League. After winning this year, they are left reeling by the departure of Buttermaker as their coach, Amanda as their pitcher, and an injury to outcast-turned-hero Timmy Lupus (Quinn Smith). Faced with a chance to play the Texas champion Houston Toros team for a shot at the Japanese champs, they devise a way to get to Houston without a coach, in order to play at the famed Astrodome, between games of a Major League Baseball doubleheader. 

At first unsure of making the trip with the team, Kelly Leak (Jackie Earle Haley) decides to go, in order to reunite with his estranged father, Mike Leak (William Devane), who left him and his mother nine years prior. After being discovered in a hotel without a chaperone by the Houston Police, Leak recruits his father as the new coach. Feeling obligated, Mike Leak accepts. Gearing up for their game, the Bears, as a whole, have trouble during practice; Kelly becomes increasingly angry and resentful towards his father (for being there for the Bears, when he wasn't there for him growing up) before ultimately storming off, while newly-recruited pitcher Carmen Ronzonni (Jimmy Baio) has trouble finding his own unique style, since he has always resorted to imitating famous pitchers. 

The team soon becomes a more cohesive and athletic unit under Coach Leak's guidance. After a skirmish with several of the Toros, Kelly later has a heart-to-heart talk with his father at a local pool hall, where Mike apologizes for his past mistakes. Kelly accepts his apology, and returns to the team before the game. The game gets called half way through due to network television broadcast time limits for the Major League double-header games, but Tanner refuses to leave the field, since he wants to "win one for 'The Looper'", who could not attend the game. 

After watching Tanner evade two officials trying to catch him on the field, Coach Leak rallies the crowd with a "Let them play!" chant, which eventually persuades the venue to continue the game. The Bears pull off an upset win, and Kelly finally makes peace with his absentee father, telling him if the team didn't need a coach he still would have looked him up.

Cast

Main cast

Supporting cast

Filming locations 

The scene where the cops roll by the van driven by Kelly was shot on Balboa Blvd in Granada Hills, California.

When the team arrives in downtown Houston, they book a room at the Concord Hotel. The building is actually the Lancaster Hotel, located off Texas Avenue across from Jones Hall.

The scene where Kelly meets with his father for the first time was filmed at the Texas Pipe Bending Company, a real business located at 2500 Galveston Road (the Park Memorial Church can be seen across the street).

Later in the film, the Bears stay at the Houston Hilton; the actual hotel is located at 6633 Travis Street in Houston, but the filming location was the Pasadena Hilton in Pasadena, California.

The scene where Coach Leak confronts Sy Orlansky about playing the Bears instead of the team from El Paso was filmed at Bayland Park. The Toros practice scenes were filmed on the Sharpstown Little League fields, with extras including girls from area middle schools.

Music 
The main theme song of the film, is by James Rolleston, titled, 'Life Is Looking Good'.

Cameos 
Members of the 1976–1977 Houston Astros make a cameo appearance during the film's climactic scene. They include Bill Virdon, César Cedeño, Enos Cabell, Ken Forsch, Bob Watson, and J.R. Richard.

Reception 
Unlike its predecessor, The Bad News Bears in Breaking Training received mixed reviews. Rotten Tomatoes gives the film a 50% rating based on 8 reviews, with an average score of 6/10.

Vincent Canby of The New York Times called it "a manufactured comedy of a slick order, depending almost entirely for its effects on the sight and sound of a bunch of kids behaving as if they were small adults. It's a formula that worked for Our Gang comedy for many years, and works again here with a bright screenplay by Paul Brickman, based on Bill Lancaster's original characters, and direction of intelligent lightness by Michael Pressman". Arthur D. Murphy of Variety called it "a pale but adequately summer-commercial sequel to the extremely successful 'Bad News Bears' Paramount hit of last year. Leonard Goldberg's production has a made-for-tv look (it even seems already pre-cut for the tube), a fair Paul Brickman script and passable direction by Michael Pressman". Gene Siskel of the Chicago Tribune gave the film 2.5 stars out of 4, finding the climactic game "enjoyable" but that the film otherwise "tries too hard" in its attempts at "heart-tugging emotion". Charles Champlin of the Los Angeles Times called it "a poorly plotted, indifferently directed, noisily overacted movie" that nevertheless "will probably do well" on the strength of the original. Gary Arnold of The Washington Post wrote that the film "struggles to justify itself as something more than a pale copy [of the original] by resorting to exaggerated displays of ribaldry and lovability". Maureen Orth wrote in Newsweek: "When the boys who play the Bears are on screen, which is often, their natural high spirits and spontaneity do much to enliven the tired script and soft direction. Kids will still find watching them vacation-time fun. But in the end, the 'Bad News Bears' without Matthau, O'Neal and Ritchie is like the Mets without Tom Seaver - deep in the doldrums". John Simon wrote: "The film is overwhelmingly uninteresting" and "enough lousy films like this, and we could unite all warring factions. Shucks".

This film is remembered for the scene in which Astros player Bob Watson first says, "Let the kids play". Coach Leak then leads the Astrodome crowd in the chant "Let them play!" when the umpires attempt to call the game prematurely because of time constraints. The crowd at the 2002 Major League Baseball All-Star Game also used this chant when the announcement came that the game would end in a tie at the end of the inning if neither team scored.

Soft Skull Press published a 2011 book about The Bad News Bears in Breaking Training as part of their Deep Focus series.  It was authored by Josh Wilker.

References

External links 
 
 
 
 
 

1977 films
1970s sports comedy-drama films
American baseball films
American sequel films
American sports comedy-drama films
Bad News Bears (franchise)
1970s English-language films
Films directed by Michael Pressman
Films scored by Craig Safan
Films set in Houston
Films shot in Houston
Houston Astros
Paramount Pictures films
1970s American films